Chlorosea is a genus of moths in the family Geometridae.

Species
 Chlorosea banksaria Sperry, 1944
 Chlorosea margaretaria Sperry, 1944
 Chlorosea nevadaria Packard, 1874
 Chlorosea roseitacta Prout, 1912

References
 Chlorosea at Markku Savela's Lepidoptera and Some Other Life Forms
 Natural History Museum Lepidoptera genus database

Geometrinae
Geometridae genera